Peter M. Weiser (October 3, 1781 – c. 1810) was an American soldier and member of the Corps of Discovery on the Lewis and Clark Expedition.

Early life
Weiser was born in Berks County, Pennsylvania of German parentage, the son of John Phillip Weiser. He was the great-grandson of noted settler and diplomat Conrad Weiser of the Pennsylvania Colony.

Lewis and Clark Expedition
Weiser enlisted as a private in the Corps of Discovery by January 1, 1804. He was probably recruited in 1803 by William Clark at Fort Kaskaskia, Illinois while serving in the 1st Infantry Regiment of the U.S. Army.

Weiser was one of several soldiers in the Corps who faced disciplinary problems before the expedition left Missouri. On March 3, 1804, he was court-martialed and found guilty of asking permission to go hunting as a pretext for an unauthorized visit to a nearby "whiskey shop". As punishment he was confined to camp for ten days.

During the expedition Weiser often served as quartermaster, cook, and hunter. During the winter of 1805–06, while the expedition was at Fort Clatsop, he was part of the salt-making detail on the Oregon coast. In the late spring of 1806, while the Corps was camped near present-day Kamiah in north central Idaho, he took part in a detached search expedition for food in the surrounding mountains. At the time, the Corps was camped by the Clearwater River waiting for the snow to melt on Lolo Pass. After the party noticed that the local Nez Perce had fresh salmon in their lodges, Weiser, Private Frazer and Sgt. John Ordway were sent on expedition to hunt for the fish in the nearby Salmon River, which they called "Lewis's River."

In July 1806 Weiser was severely injured with bad leg wound. Then on August 24, when Lewis had gotten the expedition started toward Lemhi Pass, a Shoshone rode up from the rear of the column to inform Lewis that one of his men was sick. Lewis went back to discover Weiser, whom he dosed with tincture of peppermint and laudanum.

Post-Expedition years
In 1807 Weiser, along with Corps of Discovery members John Potts and John Colter, joined the party of Spanish fur trapper Manuel Lisa on the Upper Missouri River. Lisa and his company of 42 men (including John Colter, George Drouillard or Benito Vázquez) moved up the Missouri until they reached the mouth of the Yellowstone River. Weiser was there when, after ascending the Yellowstone some 170 miles, they established Fort Raymond, a trading post at the mouth of the Bighorn River in present-day Montana.  He was at Fort Raymond in July 1808. Between 1808 and 1810 he was on the Three Forks of the Missouri and the Snake River.

Death
Weiser died around 1810 by the Blackfoot Confederacy. He may have survived up to 1825; however, this is not known.

Legacy
The town of Weiser, Idaho, and the nearby Weiser River are named for Weiser.

References

External links
NPS: Peter Weiser Profile
Clarke, the Men of the Lewis and Clark Expedition
BLM: Private Peter Weiser

1781 births
1828 deaths
Military personnel from Pennsylvania
American people of German descent
Lewis and Clark Expedition people
Quartermasters